This page summarises the Australia men's national soccer team fixtures and results in 2022.

Summary
Australia played most of the qualifiers in the third round of the qualifiers for the 2022 World Cup in 2021. Following these six matches, they sat third place in the group having won half the matches, needing to win all four of their remaining matches to secure automatic qualification and avoid a play-off. Ahead of their first match of the year, coach Graham Arnold tested positive for COVID-19 and was forced to isolate, while Ajdin Hrustic was suspended for the game and Aziz Behich got stranded due to a blizzard and couldn't fly to Melbourne. Despite the setbacks, Australia beat Vietnam 4–0, with Jamie Maclaren and Tom Rogic opening the scoring in the first half, and substitutes Craig Goodwin and Riley McGree both scoring their first senior international goals in the second half. Joel King made his senior international debut, starting instead of Behich at the left-back position, while attacker Marco Tilio was substituted on to make his debut. With the return of coach Arnold, Behich, and Hrustic, McGree tested positive for COVID-19 and missed the second match of the year. Australia drew 2–2 with Oman, leading twice firstly from a Maclaren penalty and in the second half from a goal by Aaron Mooy. Oman drew back both times with goals by Abdullah Fawaz, leaving Australia 3 points behind Japan and 4 points behind Saudi Arabia, forcing them to beat both these nations in their final games to have a chance to qualify automatically. In their third match of the year, Australia lost 2–0 to Japan after Kaoru Mitoma scored at the end of regular time and in injury time. This loss denied Australia the chance to qualify directly, and regardless of their final group match result finished third in the group and advanced to an Asian play-off against the third placed team of the other group. Australia lost the final group match against Saudi Arabia 1–0 with Salem Al-Dawsari scoring the only goal from the penalty spot. The final group day also confirmed Australia's opponents for the Asian play-off and possible interconfederational play-off. Ahead of the Asian play-off, Australia scheduled a friendly match against Jordan in Doha. Jordan opened the scoring thanks to a goal by Musa Al-Taamari, but Australia came back from behind to win 2–1, with Bailey Wright and Awer Mabil scoring. Australia won the Asian play-off 2–1 against the United Arab Emirates to qualify for the inter-confederation play-off. Jackson Irvine scored the opening goal and Hrustic scored the winning goal after Caio Canedo equalised. The inter-confederation play-off against Peru ended in a goalless draw after extra time and was decided by penalties. Arnold substituted Andrew Redmayne into the game at the end of extra-time to replace captain and regular starting goalkeeper Mathew Ryan. The tactic succeeded as Redmayne saved Peru's Alex Valera's penalty after Martin Boyle had his penalty saved and Peru's Luis Advíncula missed. Australia won the penalty shoot-out 5–4 and qualified for the World Cup's group stage, being placed in the group with Tunisia, France, and Denmark, having faced the last two at the last World Cup.

Australia celebrated a centenary for the national team, with the 100th anniversary on 17 June 2022. To mark the occasion, they scheduled a two-game friendly series against New Zealand, with the first game played at home in Brisbane and the second game away in Auckland. Australia won the first game 1–0, with Mabil scoring the only goal from long distance. In the second game, Australia handed debuts to Harrison Delbridge, Jason Cummings, Ryan Strain, Cameron Devlin, Garang Kuol, and Keanu Baccus. They won the game 2–0 with veteran Mitchell Duke scoring the first goal and debutant Cummings scoring a penalty for the second.

Australia opened their group stage of the 2022 World Cup against defending champions France. They opened the match positively, attacking often and Goodwin scoring his second international goal to give Australia the lead. Unfortunately, France were ultimately too strong a team and Australia lost 4–1 after French players Adrien Rabiot and Kylian Mbappé scored a goal each and Olivier Giroud scored a brace, making him France's men's joint top goalscorer. In their second match, Australia beat Tunisia 1–0, with Duke heading in the only goal. He celebrated the goal by signing the letter J, dedicating it to his son Jaxson, who was sitting in the stands. In the third match against Denmark, a draw would've been enough to ensure qualification to the knockout stage so long as France didn't lose to Tunisia, while a victory would ensure the progression. While France played a second string team that lost to Tunisia, Australia beat Denmark 1–0 thanks to a strong defence and a 60th minute individual goal by Mathew Leckie that sent them to the round of 16 for only the second time in history. In the round of 16, Australia lost 2–1 to Argentina with Lionel Messi opening the scoring and Julián Álvarez getting the second after dispossessing Mathew Ryan. Australia pulled one back with Goodwin's shot deflected into goal off Enzo Fernández and Kuol almost scored the equaliser in injury time, but his shot was smothered by Argentinian goalkeeper Emiliano Martínez.

Record

Match results

Friendlies
This section is for matches confirmed by Football Australia, please do not add speculative fixtures.

World Cup qualifiers

World Cup

Player statistics
Correct as of 3 December 2022 (v. ).
Numbers are listed by player's number in last match played

References

External links
 Socceroos Fixtures and Results

Australia national soccer team seasons
2022 national football team results
2022 in Australian soccer